Dmitry Vasilyev may refer to:
 Dmitriy Vassiliev (born 1979), Russian ski jumper
 Dmitry Vasilyev (biathlete) (born 1962), Soviet biathlete and Olympic champion
 Dmitri Vasilyev (runner), Russian runner who participated in the 2000 Summer Olympics
 Dmitri Dmitriyevich Vasilyev (1945–2003), leader of the Russian nationalistic Pamyat movement
 Dmitri Vasilyev (director) (1900–1984), Soviet film director
 Dmitri Vasilyev (footballer, born 1977) (Dmitri Vladimirovich Vasilyev, born 1977), Russian international footballer with FC Shinnik Yaroslavl and FC Rubin Kazan
 Dmitri Vasilyev (footballer, born 1985) (born 1985), Russian footballer with FC Shinnik Yaroslavl and FC Krylia Sovetov Samara